Nikolai Andrej Schukoff (born 1969) is an Austrian operatic  tenor.

Life 
Born in Graz, Schukoff completed his vocal studies at the Mozarteum in Salzburg with a diploma in "music-dramatic performance", for which he was awarded the Lilli Lehmann Medal in 1996. He made his debut the same year as Alfredo in Verdi's La traviata at the Musiktheater im Revier in Gelsenkirchen. Afterwards he worked some years at the Nationaltheater Mannheim and at the Staatstheater Nürnberg.

From 2006, he mainly performed in heldentenor roles, leading to his international breakthrough, including Siegmund in Wagner's Die Walküre, the title role in Weber's  Der Freischütz and Bacchus in Ariadne auf Naxos by Richard Strauss. His repertoire also contains Italian and French works.

Schukoff works freelance and has had engagements at the Opéra National de Paris, the Metropolitan Opera in New York and the Bayerische Staatsoper, among others.

He also works as a concert singer, for example in the role of Waldemar in Schönberg's Gurre-Lieder at the Wiener Musikverein conducted by Zubin Mehta.

Roles 
 Beethoven: Fidelio – Florestan
 Bellini: Norma – Pollione
 Bizet: Carmen – Don José
 Janáček: Jenůfa – Števa Buryja
 Kálmán: Gräfin Mariza – Tassilo
 Lehár: The Merry Widow – Danilo
 Verdi: Attila – Foresto
 Giuseppe Verdi: La traviata – Alfredo
 Wagner: Der fliegende Holländer – Erik
 Wagner: Das Rheingold – Loge
 Wagner: Die Walküre – Siegmund
 Wagner: Parsifal – Parsifal
 Weber: Der Freischütz – Max
 Strauss: Die Fledermaus – Eisenstein

References

External links 
 Nikolai Schukoff on Opera base
 Nikolai Schukoff Homepage
 "Ich möchte lange ein Tenor des Moments sein" Merker-Online Interview, 11/2005
 "Mehr Kind als Mann" Merkur-Online, 23 March 2009

External links 
 

1969 births
Living people
Musicians from Graz
Austrian operatic tenors
Heldentenors